Thierry Uvenard (born 29 March 1964) is a retired French football defender and later manager. He is the current manager of Le Havre AC's women's team.

References

1964 births
Living people
French footballers
Le Havre AC players
Ligue 1 players
Ligue 2 players
Association football defenders
French football managers
Le Havre AC managers

Ligue 1 managers
Ligue 2 managers